Laos, officially the Lao People's Democratic Republic, competed at the 2020 Summer Olympics in Tokyo. Originally scheduled to take place from 24 July to 9 August 2020, the Games were postponed to 23 July to 8 August 2021, due to the COVID-19 pandemic. This was the nation's tenth appearance at the Olympics, since its debut in 1980.

Competitors
The following is the list of number of competitors in the Games.

Athletics

Laos received a universality slot from the World Athletics to send a female track and field athlete to the Olympics.

Track & road events

Judo
 
Laos entered one male judoka into the Olympic tournament based on the International Judo Federation Olympics Individual Ranking.

Swimming

Laos received a universality invitation from FINA to send two top-ranked swimmers (one per gender) in their respective individual events to the Olympics, based on the FINA Points System of June 28, 2021.

References

Olympics
2020
Nations at the 2020 Summer Olympics